The 1992 United States presidential election in West Virginia took place on November 3, 1992, as part of the 1992 United States presidential election. Voters chose five representatives, or electors to the Electoral College, who voted for president and vice president.

West Virginia was won by Governor Bill Clinton (D-Arkansas) with 48.41% of the popular vote over incumbent President George H. W. Bush (R-Texas) with 35.39%. Businessman Ross Perot (I-Texas) finished in third, with 15.92% of the popular vote. Clinton ultimately won the national vote, defeating incumbent President Bush.

, this is the last election in which Wirt County voted for the Democratic candidate.

Results

By congressional district

By county 
Clinton won 42 of West Virginia's 55 counties.

References

West Virginia
1992
1992 West Virginia elections